London School of Musical Theatre (LSMT) is a training academy of performing arts, that was founded by Glenn Lee in 1995. The school is located on Borough Road, central London.
It was originally housed at The Old Vic and then Her Majesty's Theatre, before moving to premises on Borough Road where it currently operates.

The school offers a one-year, full-time, vocational training for adults wishing to pursue a career in musical theatre. The ethos of LSMT is to create the environment of a professional company in rehearsal rather than that of an educational institution. The emphasis of the course is on the development of the singing voice as the tool for acting through song alongside a thorough training in dance and drama. Classes are taught by professionals and practitioners working in the industry, with direct experience of the requirements of musical theatre. 

Since its inception in 1995, the organisation has commissioned new musical theatre productions, many of which have now been published and performed around the world. The school employs Charles Miller as composer-in-residence.

Notable Alumni
 Emma Hatton - actress (Wicked, Evita)
Melissa Jacques - actress (Everybody's Talking about Jamie, Mamma Mia)
Sophie Isaacs - actress (Six, Heathers, Made In Dagenham, Legally Blonde)
Jacqui Tate - actress (Les Miserables, Avenue Q, South Pacific, The Phantom of The Opera)
Adam Bayjou - actor/singer (Les Miserables, Assassins, Opera Boys)
Richard Meek - actor (Annie, The Producers, Rocky Horror Show, Hairspray)
Hollie O'Donoghue - actress (Les Miserables, The Commitments)
Nancy Sullivan- actress (Les Miserables, Little Voice, Beautiful Thing)
Jodie Jacobs - actress (We Will Rock You, Evita, Fame, Footloose, The Wedding Singer)
Rosa O'Reilly - actress (Wicked, Jesus Christ Superstar, Les Miserables, Dirty Dancing)
Michael Auger - singer (Collabro)
Natalie Law - actress (Leopaldstadt, The Lady Vanishes, Exit The King, Ink)
Soophia Foroughi - actress (Prince of Egypt, Broken Wings, Dirty Rotten Scoundrels)
Marcus Ayton - actor (Shrek, Joseph and the Amazing Technicolour Dream Coat)
Devon Elise Johnson - actress (Half a Sixpence, Mamma Mia, Titanic)
Holly-Anne Hull (Phantom of The Opera, Les Miserables, Copacobana)
Kelly Agbowu - actress (Waitress, Book of Mormon, Lion King, Les Miserables)
Adam Strong - actor (We Will Rock You, Rock of Ages, Jesus Christ Superstar)
Robbie Scotcher - actor (Blood Brothers, Mamma Mia, Miss Saigon)

Luke Newton - TV/Film actor (Bridgerton, Lake Placid, The Lodge)
Danny Walters - TV/Film actor (EastEnders, Benidorm, Call The Midwife)
Olivia Chenery - TV/Film actress (Endeavour, Silent Witness, Virgin and Martyr, Penny Dreadful, My Friends Best Wedding, The One)

External Sources

External links 
 London School of Musical Theatre website

Performing arts education in London
Schools of the performing arts in the United Kingdom
Music schools in London
Drama schools in London
Educational institutions established in 1995
Musical theatre organizations